iPhone 3 may refer to one of two mobile phones made by Apple Inc.:

The iPhone 3G, a mobile phone released in 2008
The iPhone 3GS, a mobile phone released in 2009